Lepidochrysops victoriae, the Victoria blue or Lake Victoria giant Cupid, is a butterfly in the family Lycaenidae.

Range and habitat
It is found in Burkina Faso, Ghana, Togo, Benin, Nigeria, Cameroon, the DR Congo, South Sudan, Uganda and Kenya. The habitat consists of savanna.

Subspecies
 Lepidochrysops victoriae victoriae — western Kenya
 Lepidochrysops victoriae occidentalis Libert & Collins, 2001 — Burkina Faso, northern Ghana, northern Togo, northern Benin, northern Nigeria, northern Cameroon, north-western Democratic Republic of the Congo, southern Sudan, Uganda
 Lepidochrysops victoriae vansomereni Stempffer, 1951 — Kenya: central part to the area east of the Rift Valley

References

Butterflies described in 1895
Lepidochrysops
Butterflies of Africa